Pinsk Region (Pinsk Voblast) was a territorial unit in the Byelorussian Soviet Socialist Republic created after the annexation of West Belarus into the BSSR in November 1939. The administrative centre of the province was the city of Pinsk, the oblast was founded on 4 December 1939 with 16.3 thousand square km and 533.6 thousand people.

The Voblast consisted of 11 raions:
Hantsavitski
Davyd-Haradotski
Drahichynski
Zhabchytski
Ivanauski
Lahishynski
Lyeninski
Luninyetski
Pinski
Stolinski
Cyelyekhanski
With four cities: Pinsk, Davyd-Haradok, Luninyets and Stolin

On January 8, 1954, due to the administrative reform of the BSSR the Oblast was completely incorporated into the modern Brest Voblast.

External links
Administrative division of Belarus: a historical information
Information

Former subdivisions of Belarus
Soviet occupation of Eastern Poland 1939–1941